Hlas is a political party in the Czech Republic. It was founded in March 2019 by Pavel Telička and Petr Ježek, both members of the European Parliament elected for ANO 2011. The party ran in the 2019 European Parliament election, receiving 56,449 votes (2.38%), not enough to win any seats.

References

External links
Official website

Political parties established in 2019
Liberal parties in the Czech Republic
Pro-European political parties in the Czech Republic
ANO 2011 breakaway groups